Sophia Jensen (born September 18, 2001) is a Canadian sprint canoeist. She has been a member of the Canoe Kayak Canada sprint national team since 2017. Jensen is considered to be an important figure in women's sprint canoe worldwide and, in 2019, she was named National Female Athlete of the Year at the Sports Québec annual gala.

Sophia Jensen competes in women's C-1 as well as with her current partner Julia Lilley Osende, from the canoe club Mic Mac AAC Canoe Club, in the women's C-2 event. During the 2021 season, Jensen competed with her now former partner Anna Roy-Cyr, from the Lac-Beauport Canoe Club , whilst Osende had temporarily withdrawn from competition. Jensen currently trains out of Cascades Canoe Club in Chelsea, Québec, Canada.

Career

Sophia Jensen began sprint canoe at the age of 12 at Cascades Canoe Club after having moved to Chelsea, Quebec. 
In 2016, Jensen made her international debut at the Olympic Hopes Regatta in Szeged, Hungary, where she won the gold medal in women's C-1 200m, C-1 500m, C-2 500m and C-2 1000m. She also won the silver medal in C-1 1000m and bronze in C-2 200m in Szeged. 
In 2017, at the Pan American Canoe Championships in Ibarra, Ecuador, Sophia Jensen dominated women's canoe by winning gold in the C-1 200m, C-1 500m and C-1 1000m events.

Sophia Jensen also won gold in the C-1 200m, C-1 500m and C-2 500m events at the 2018 ICF Sprint Canoe Junior and U23 World Championships in Plovdiv, Bulgaria.

At the 2019 ICF Sprint Canoe Junior and U23 World Championships in Pitești, Romania. Jensen won the gold medal in the C-1 200m, C-1 500m and C-2 500m events.

In 2021, at the ICF Junior and U23 Canoe Sprint World Championships in Montemor-O-Velho, Sophia Jensen won gold in the Women's C-1 200m as well as silver in the Women's C-4 500m and bronze in the Women's C-2 500m. Finally, Jensen won the gold medal in the mixed C-2 500m with her partner Alix Plomteux.

See also
Canoe Kayak Canada
Canoe sprint

References

External links
ICF profile

Living people
Canadian female canoeists
2001 births
ICF Canoe Sprint World Championships medalists in Canadian
21st-century Canadian women